Goleba lyra is a species of jumping spider in the genus Goleba that is found in Madagascar. The species was first described by Wayne Maddison and J. X. Zhang in 2006.

References

Salticidae
Spiders described in 2006
Spiders of Africa